Accotink refers to multiple placenames and geological features within the U.S. state of Virginia.

 Accotink, Virginia
 Accotink Bay
 Accotink Bay Wildlife Refuge
 Accotink Creek
 Lake Accotink